The 2006 NCAA Division I softball tournament was the twenty-fifth annual tournament to determine the national champion of NCAA women's collegiate softball. Held during May and June 2006, sixty-four Division I college softball teams contested the championship. The tournament featured eight regionals of eight teams, each in a double elimination format. The 2006 Women's College World Series was held in Oklahoma City, Oklahoma from June 1 through June 6 and marked the conclusion of the 2006 NCAA Division I softball season.  Arizona won their seventh championship by defeating  two games to none in the championship series.  Arizona pitcher Alicia Hollowell was named Women's College World Series Most Outstanding Player.

Qualifying

Regionals

Austin Super Regional

Corvallis Super Regional

Evanston Super Regional

Knoxville Super Regional

Los Angeles Super Regional

Tempe Super Regional

Tucson Super Regional

Tuscaloosa Super Regional

Women's College World Series

Bracket

Game results

Championship game

All Tournament Team
The following players were members of the All-Tournament Team.
 Monica Abbott, Tennessee
 Eileen Canney, Northwestern
 Autumn Champion, Arizona
 Garland Cooper, Northwestern
 Andrea Duran, UCLA
 Kristi Durant, Tennessee
 Alicia Hollowell, Arizona
 Caitlin Lowe, Arizona
 Heidi Knabe, Arizona State
 Taryne Mowatt, Arizona
 Cat Osterman, Texas
 Tammy Williams, Northwestern

References

2006 NCAA Division I softball season
NCAA Division I softball tournament